Placocarpus schaereri is a species of saxicolous (rock-dwelling), areolate, and crustose lichen in the family Verrucariaceae. Found in Europe, it is the type species of genus Placocarpus. The lichen was first described scientifically in 1831 by Elias Magnus Fries, who called it Parmelia schaereri. The species epithet honours Swiss pastor and lichenologist Ludwig Schaerer. Othmar Breuss transferred it to the newly reinstated genus Placocarpus in 1985.

Juvenile forms of Placocarpus schaereri are often parasitic on the lichen Protoparmeliopsis muralis.

References

Verrucariales
Lichen species
Lichens described in 1831
Lichens of Europe
Lichenicolous lichens
Taxa named by Elias Magnus Fries